HMS Tamar or Tamer was a 16-gun Favourite-class sloop-of-war of the Royal Navy.

The ship was launched in Saltash in 1758 and stationed in Newfoundland from 1763 to 1777.

From 21 June 1764 to mid-1766, under Commander Patrick Mouat, she accompanied the Dolphin on a circumnavigation of the globe during which the latter's commander, Capt. Byron, took possession of and named the Falkland Islands in January 1765.

Her Captain on 1 January 1775 is listed as Cpt. Edward Thornborough, with ship's name spelled Tamer.

The warship hosted South Carolina's royal governor, Lord William Campbell, beginning in September 1775, when increasingly-violent patriot activity drove the governor from his home on the mainland. She was renamed HMS Pluto when she was converted into a fire ship in 1777. The French privateer Duc de Chartres captured her on 30 November 1780.  Her subsequent fate is unknown.

Citations and references
Citations

References

External links
 

Sloops
Ships of the Royal Navy
1758 ships